Kevin Hays (born 12 May 1994) is a former professional American  Rubik's Cube speedcuber. Recognized as an expert at solving big cubes (5x5, 6x6 and 7x7), he has won 6 world championship titles and set 21 world records across the three events. He has also set 47 North American records and won 21 US National titles.

Personal life
Hays grew up in Renton, Washington, where he started speedcubing during his freshman year of high school in January 2009. Hays then attended college and continued speedcubing at Washington University in St. Louis. He also swam on the Washington University Bears varsity swim team. He now lives in Boston, MA.

In 2019, Hays competed on the American television game show series Mental Samurai, finishing 5th overall.

Speedsolving career
At Hays' first competition, US Nationals 2009, Hays placed 4th in the 6x6 event and made finals in the 5x5 event. The following Summer, at US Nationals 2010, Hays won the national title in the 6x6 event, finishing with a winning average of 2:36.44. Hays broke his first world records the next year at US Nationals 2011, solving the 6x6 cube in world record single and average times of 2:02.31 and 2:09.03 respectively.

Hays attended his first World Championships in October 2011 in Bangkok, Thailand. Despite holding the 6x6 world record average that he set at 2011 US Nationals, Hays placed last in the finals, with a result of DNF (Did Not Finish). He placed 2nd in the 7x7 event with an average time of 3:46.99. At the US Nationals 2012, Hays won the 4x4, 5x5, 6x6, and 7x7 events, and placed 3rd in the 3×3 event. Hays claimed the US National champion title in the 5x5, 6x6, and 7x7 events at five consecutive US Nationals from 2012 to 2016, and placed top 3 in the same events at ten consecutive US Nationals from 2010 to 2019.

In 2013, at the World Rubik's Cube Championship in Las Vegas, NV, Hays placed first in the 5x5, 6x6, and 7x7 events, becoming the first person to win all three events at one world championship. At the 2015 World Championship in Sao Paulo, Brazil, he defended his 6x6 and 7x7 titles, and placed second in the 5x5 event behind Feliks Zemdegs. At the 2017 World Championship in Paris, France, he defended his 6x6 title once again, and placed second in the 7x7 event behind Feliks Zemdegs. In 2019, Hays failed to defend his 6x6 title during the World Championship in Melbourne, Australia, placing second behind Max Park.

Hays has broken the 6x6 single world record 6 times, and the average record 9 times. From December 10, 2011 to December 17, 2016, Hays was the only person to hold the 6x6 world record single, taking the record from 1:54.81 to 1:32.77. On March 10, 2018, Hays became the first person to solve a 7x7 in under 2 minutes in competition, breaking the world record with a time of 1:59.95.

On August 10, 2019 Hays posted a statement indicating his retirement from elite speedcubing, shifting his focus to enjoying speedcubing as a hobby rather than a sport.

On January 1, 2022, Hays announced his retirement from professional speedcubing.

Notable results

World Records
(Current records in bold)

World Championship Podiums

Official Personal Bests

References

External links
 
 Kevin Hays' Official Rubik's Cube Results
 Kevin Hays Reddit Questionnaire (12 August 2013)

1994 births
Living people
American speedcubers
People from Renton, Washington
Washington University Bears athletes